Flight 345 may refer to:

Turkish Airlines Flight 345, crashed on 30 January 1975
Southwest Airlines Flight 345, crashed on July 22, 2013

0345